Spbetavirus (formerly Spbetalikevirus and sometimes SPbeta-like viruses) is a genus of viruses in the order Caudovirales, in the family Siphoviridae. Bacteria serve as natural hosts. There is only one species in this genus: Bacillus virus SPbeta.

Structure
Spbetaviruses are nonenveloped, with a head and tail. The head is about 81 nm in diameter. The tail is long, but fairly rigid, at about 355 nm long, 10 nm wide. It has six club-shaped terminal fibers and no collar.

Genome
Genomes are linear, around 134kb in length. Bacillus phage SPbeta has been fully sequenced. It has about 134k nucleotides, with 185 proteins. The complete genome is available here

Life cycle
Viral replication is cytoplasmic. The virus attaches to the host cell's adhesion receptors using its terminal fiber, and degrades the cell wall using viral exolysin enough to eject the viral DNA into the host cytoplasm via long flexible tail ejection system. Replication follows the replicative transposition model. DNA-templated transcription is the method of transcription. Once the viral genes have been replicated, the procapsid is assembled and packed. The tail is then assembled and the mature virions are released via lysis. Bacteria serve as the natural host. Transmission routes are passive diffusion.

History
According to ICTV's ninth report, the genus Spbetalikevirus was first accepted under the name SPbeta-like viruses, assigned to family Siphoviridae, order Caudovirales. The genus was renamed to Spbetalikevirus in 2012.  The genus was renamed Spbetalikevirus in 2015.

References

External links
 Viralzone: Spbetalikevirus
 ICTV

Siphoviridae
Virus genera
Bacillus phages